The canton of Vichy-2 is an administrative division of the Allier department, in central France. It was created at the French canton reorganisation which came into effect in March 2015. Its seat is in Vichy.

It consists of the following communes: 
Abrest 
Saint-Yorre
Vichy (partly)

References

Cantons of Allier